Zouhair Talbi (born 8 April 1995) is a Moroccan long distance runner.

Originally from Tighassaline, Khenifra, Morocco, he studied at the Northwest Kansas Technical College, and then moved to Oklahoma City University. He was a 2015 World University Games silver medalist. He set a 28:02 personal best in Portland, Oregon in 2019.

On May 14, 2021, he met the Olympic qualifying standard as he won the 10,000m at the Sound Running Track Meet in California and in doing so improved his personal best from 28:02 to 27:20:61. It was the second-fastest performance ever by a collegiate athlete and ranked No. 7 in the world for the year so far. Displaying a fast finish Talbi was in third with two laps remaining before covering the final 400 meters in 59.41 seconds to beat Emmanuel Bor and Joe Klecker. However, Talbi had to be pulled from the Olympics shortly before the commencement as he had not met the drug testing requirements for an athlete from Morocco.

References

1995 births
Living people
Moroccan long-distance runners
People from Béni Mellal-Khénifra
Florida State Seminoles men's track and field athletes
Oklahoma City Stars athletes
Medalists at the 2015 Summer Universiade
Universiade medalists in athletics (track and field)
Universiade silver medalists for Morocco